Nicario Jiménez Quispe (born in 1957) is a Peruvian-American retablo maker. He was born in the village of Alcamenca in Ayacucho, Peru, high in the Andes mountain range. He makes traditional Andean altarpieces, small wooden boxes filled with figures, animals and other objects that tell a story. Spanish priests used them to teach about the Catholic saints. He is a third generation retablo artist and learned the tradition from his father and grandfather. He also studied sculpture at several universities in Peru. The main altarpieces represent religious, historical and everyday life events. They can be humorous or political. His works are based on their pre-Hispanic Andean art and family influences. In 2012, he was the recipient of a Florida Folk Heritage Award.

His altarpiece figurines are made by hand with a mix of boiled potato and gypsum powder. His work has appeared in major museum exhibitions, including the Smithsonian Institution where they are part of the permanent collection. Nicario has taught at universities and international conferences, and his work is in many prestigious art collections. Jimenez is now living in Naples, Florida, where he creates retablos that feature different stories of the struggles of Latino immigrants and scenes of Hispanic neighborhoods in South Florida. Through his works, Nicario Jimenez, the "artist of the Andes," has shared the art form of the altarpiece with audiences around the world.

References

1957 births
Living people
Peruvian artists
People from Ayacucho
Peruvian emigrants to the United States